The 1984 Alabama A&M Bulldogs football team represented Alabama Agricultural and Mechanical University as a member of the Southern Intercollegiate Athletic Conference (SIAC) during the 1984 NCAA Division II football season. The Bulldogs were led by first-year head coach Ed Wyche. They finished season with an overall record of 5–4–2 and a mark of 4–2–1 in conference play.

Schedule

References

Alabama AandM
Alabama A&M Bulldogs football seasons
Alabama AandM Bulldogs football team